Latifa or Lateefa is a feminine Arabic (لٓطِيفٓة) given name which means "gentle" or "pleasant". It corresponds to the masculine Latif.

Notable persons

Lateefa
 Lateefa Al Gaood, Bahraini politician
 Lateefah Simon, American activist

Latifa
 Latifa (singer), or Latifa Arfaoui, Tunisian pop music singer
 Princess Fawzia-Latifa of Egypt, Egyptian princess
 Latifa Baka, Moroccan author
 Latifa Elouadrhiri, Moroccan physicist
 Lalla Latifa Hammou, widow of king Hassan II
 Latifa bint Mohammed Al Maktoum, UAE princess 
 Latifa Ben Mansour, Algerian writer and linguist
 Latifa bint Abdulaziz Al Saud, Saudi royal
 Latifa bint Fahd Al Saud, Saudi royal 
 Latifa al-Zayyat, Egyptian activist and writer

Latifah
 Queen Latifah, American rapper, singer, and actress

See also
 Latife, the Turkish form of the name

References

Arabic feminine given names
Bosnian feminine given names